Britta Jänicke is a paralympic athlete from Germany competing mainly in category F46 throwing events.

Britta has competed in 4 paralympics.  In the 1988 Summer Paralympics she won the discus and javelin gold medals.  The 1992 Summer Paralympics saw a change in that Britta did the 100m but only managed to finish seventh in the final.  1996 saw Britta back in throws, competing in the javelin, winning silver in the shot put and bronze in the discus.  It was these last two that she competed at in the 2000 Summer Paralympics winning the gold medal in the shot put with a world record throw and a second consecutive bronze in the discus.

References

Paralympic athletes of Germany
Athletes (track and field) at the 1988 Summer Paralympics
Athletes (track and field) at the 1992 Summer Paralympics
Athletes (track and field) at the 1996 Summer Paralympics
Athletes (track and field) at the 2000 Summer Paralympics
Paralympic gold medalists for Germany
Paralympic silver medalists for Germany
Paralympic bronze medalists for Germany
Living people
World record holders in Paralympic athletics
Medalists at the 1988 Summer Paralympics
Medalists at the 1996 Summer Paralympics
Medalists at the 2000 Summer Paralympics
Year of birth missing (living people)
Paralympic medalists in athletics (track and field)
German female discus throwers
German female javelin throwers
German female shot putters
Discus throwers with limb difference
Javelin throwers with limb difference
Shot putters with limb difference
Paralympic discus throwers
Paralympic javelin throwers
Paralympic shot putters